Hermann Dorner (23 May 1882 – 6 February 1963) was a German pioneer of aviation.  During the First World War he designed two-seat combat aircraft for Hannoversche Waggonfabrik, most notably the Hannover CL.II through Hannover CL.IV designs.

References
"Im Schatten von Hans Grade: Hermann Dorner, der Einzelkämpfer," In Fliegermagazin, 2003, 5/96

1882 births
1963 deaths
German aviators
Aviation pioneers
Officers Crosses of the Order of Merit of the Federal Republic of Germany